Sarah Michel (born 10 January 1989) is a French basketball player for CJM Bourges Basket and the French national team, where she participated at the 2016 Summer Olympics.

References

External links

1989 births
Living people
Shooting guards
French women's basketball players
Basketball players at the 2016 Summer Olympics
Basketball players at the 2020 Summer Olympics
Olympic basketball players of France
People from Ris-Orangis
Sportspeople from Essonne
France women's national basketball team players
Medalists at the 2020 Summer Olympics
Olympic medalists in basketball
Olympic bronze medalists for France
21st-century French women